Ambulyx rudloffi is a species of moth of the  family Sphingidae. It is known from Papua New Guinea.

References

Ambulyx
Moths described in 2005
Moths of New Guinea